The 606th Special Operations Squadron  is an inactive unit of the United States Air Force.  The squadron was first activated as the 606th Air Commando Squadron in March 1966 and stationed at Nakhon Phanom Royal Thai Air Force Base, Thailand.  The squadron flew C-123 Provider and A-26A bomber aircraft over the Ho Chi Minh trail at night during the Vietnam War to interdict the movement of people and equipment. The squadron was inactivated on 30 June 1971.

Organization 
The 606th Special Forces Squadron was composed of two sections, the Fairchild C-123 Provider section which was under the call sign of "Candlestick", and the U-10 Helio Courier section which was under the call signs of "Loudmouth" and "Litterbugs" (and "Clown" for Civil Action missions).

History
C-123s had been used in Vietnam since 1962 to drop flares for night interdiction missions, but their use declined after the introduction of the Douglas AC-47 Spooky in the country.  The continued need for flare drop aircraft continued for operations over Laos, and in the spring of 1966, Pacific Air Forces activated the 606th Air Commando Squadron at Nakhon Phanom Royal Thai Air Force Base, Thailand and equipped it with UC-123Bs to continue this mission.

Although starting out as a flare support flight, the UC-123s had added night reconnaissance and forward air control, which became its primary missions by 1968. The squadron flew from four to nine night reconnaissance missions per night over the Steel Tiger and Barrel Roll areas of Laos, flying in shifts to provide coverage throughout the night. After a lack of success with the use of starlight scopes in T-28s, a locally manufactured mount was designed and mounted near the Provider's escape hatch, which enabled an observer to sweep the area below the plane for targets.  "Candlestick" flare and reconnaissance planes then teamed up with "Zorro" T-28s or "Nimrod' Douglas A-26 Invaders strike aircraft as a hunter killer team.

By 1969, heavy antiaircraft fire proved a problem for the "Candlestick" aircraft, which had upgraded to the UC-123K. The unit improvised a defense using chaff, which was manually thrown out the floor hatch to confuse enemy radars. The "Candlestick" operation ended when the squadron was inactivated in June 1971.

North American T-28 Trojans, call sign "Zorro" also flew with the 606th.   Twelve of them moved to Nakhon Phanom in June 1966 along with Douglas A-26 Invader "Nimrods".  After being credited with 67 truck strikes during the week of 2 through 9 November 1966, a detachment of Douglas A-26 Invader "Nimrods" was attached to the 606th. In September 1967, this detachment plus the T-28 "Zorro" forward air controllers were spun off into the 609th Special Operations Squadron.

Lineage
 Constituted as the 606th Air Commando Squadron, Composite and activated on 12 January 1966 (not organized)
 Organized on 8 March 1966
 Redesignated 606th Special Operations Squadron on 1 August 1968
 Inactivated on 15 June 1971

Assignments
 Pacific Air Forces, 12 January 1966 (not organized)
 Thirteenth Air Force, 8 March 1966 (attached to 2d Air Division)
 634th Combat Support Group, 8 April 1966
 56th Air Commando Wing (later 56th Special Operations Wing), 8 April 1967 - 15 June 1971

Stations
 Nakhon Phanom Royal Thai Air Force Base, 8 March 1966 - 15 June 1971

Aircraft
 Fairchild UC-123B
 Fairchild UC-123K
 North American T-28 Trojan
 Helio U-10 Courier

Awards and campaigns

References

Notes

Citations

Bibliography

 
 Halliday, John T.  " Flying Through Midnight: A Pilot's Dramatic Story of His Secret Missions Over Laos During the Vietnam War", Scribner, published Nov 2005, . 
 AF Pamphlet 900-2, Unit Decorations, Awards and Campaign Participation Credits Department of the Air Force, Washington, DC, 15 June 1971
 AF Pamphlet 900-2, Unit Decorations, Awards and Campaign Participation Credits, Vol II Department of the Air Force, Washington, DC, 30 September 1976

Special operations squadrons of the United States Air Force